Following is a 1998 independent neo-noir crime thriller film written, produced, edited and directed by Christopher Nolan. It tells the story of a young man who follows strangers around the streets of London and is drawn into a criminal underworld when he fails to keep his distance.

As Nolan's debut feature, it was designed to be as inexpensive as possible to make. Scenes were heavily rehearsed so that just one or two takes were needed to economise on 16mm film stock, the production's greatest expense, and for which Nolan was paying from his salary. Unable to afford expensive professional lighting equipment, Nolan mostly used available light. Along with writing, directing, and photographing the film, Nolan also helped in editing and production.

The film was released by The Criterion Collection on both Blu-ray and DVD in North America on 11 December 2012.

Plot
A struggling, unemployed young writer (credited as "The Young Man") takes to following strangers around the streets of London, ostensibly to find inspiration for his first novel. Initially, he sets strict rules for himself regarding whom he should follow and for how long, but he soon discards them as he focuses on a well-groomed, handsome man in a dark suit. The man in the suit, having noticed he is being followed, quickly confronts the Young Man and introduces himself as "Cobb". Cobb reveals that he is a serial burglar and invites the Young Man (who tells Cobb his name is "Bill") to accompany him on various burglaries. The material gains from these crimes seem to be of secondary importance to Cobb. He takes pleasure in rifling through the personal items in his targets' flats and drinking their wine. He explains that his true passion is using the shock of robbery and violation of property to make his victims re-examine their lives. He sums up his attitude thus: "You take it away, and show them what they had."

The Young Man is thrilled by Cobb's lifestyle. He attempts break-ins of his own, as Cobb encourages and guides him. At Cobb's suggestion, he alters his appearance, cutting his hair short and wearing a dark suit. He assumes the name "Daniel Lloyd" based on the credit card Cobb gives to him and begins to pursue a relationship with a blonde woman whose flat he and Cobb burgled. The Blonde turns out to be the girlfriend of a small-time gangster (known only as the "Bald Guy") whom she broke up with after he murdered a man in her flat. Soon, the Blonde confides that the Bald Guy is blackmailing her with incriminating photographs. The Young Man breaks into the Bald Guy's safe, but is caught in the act by an unidentified man. He then bludgeons the man with a claw hammer and flees with the Bald Guy's money and photos. Upon returning to his flat, he finds that the photos are innocuous modeling shots.

Confronting the Blonde, the Young Man learns that she and Cobb have been working together to manipulate him into mimicking Cobb's burglary methods. She tells him that Cobb had recently discovered a murdered woman's body during one of his burglaries and is attempting to deflect suspicion from himself by making it appear as though multiple burglars share his MO.

The Young Man leaves to turn himself in to the police. The Blonde reports her success to Cobb, who then reveals that he actually works for the Bald Guy. The story about the murdered woman was part of a plot to deceive both the Blonde and the Young Man: The Blonde has been blackmailing the Bald Guy with evidence from the murder he committed in her flat, and he wants her murdered in such a way that it cannot be connected to him. Cobb bludgeons the Blonde to death with the same claw hammer that the Young Man used during the burglary of the Bald Guy's safe and leaves it at the scene. The police, checking out the Young Man's story, find the Blonde murdered and the claw hammer with his fingerprints on it. The Young Man is thus implicated for the murder of the blonde woman. Cobb, meanwhile, vanishes into a crowd.

Cast

Jeremy Theobald as The Young Man [Bill / Daniel ("Danny") Lloyd]
Alex Haw as Cobb
Lucy Russell as The Blonde
John Nolan as The Policeman
Dick Bradsell as The Bald Guy
Gillian El-Kadi as Home Owner
Jennifer Angel as Waitress
Nicolas Carlotti as Barman
Darren Ormandy as Accountant
Guy Greenway as Heavy #1
Tassos Stevens as Heavy #2
Tristan Martin as Man at Bar
Rebecca James as Woman at Bar
Paul Mason as Home Owner's Friend
David Bovill as Home Owner's Husband

Production
Following was written, directed, filmed, and co-produced by Christopher Nolan. It was filmed in London on black-and-white 16mm film stock. Nolan used a non-linear plot structure for the film, a device he again used in Memento, Batman Begins, and The Prestige. This type of storytelling, he says, reflected the audience's inherent uncertainty about characters in film noir:

In a compelling story of this genre we are continually being asked to rethink our assessment of the relationship between the various characters, and I decided to structure my story in such a way as to emphasize the audience's incomplete understanding of each new scene as it is first presented.

Following was written and planned to be as inexpensive to produce as possible, but Nolan has described the production of the film as "extreme", even for a low-budget shoot. With little money, limited equipment, and a cast and crew who were all in full-time employment on weekdays, the production took a full year to complete.

To conserve expensive film stock, every scene in the film was rehearsed extensively to ensure that the first or second take could be used in the final edit. Filming took place on Saturdays for three or four months; Nolan shot about fifteen minutes of footage each day. This time frame also moderated the cost of film-stock and allowed him to pay for it out of his salary. For the most part, Nolan filmed without professional film lighting equipment, largely employing available light. This was made easier by the decision to use 16 mm black and white film, since that eliminated the need to match light colour. He also used the homes of his friends and family as locations.

Reception

Critical response
Following received generally positive reviews. The film has an approval rating of 81% on Rotten Tomatoes based on 32 reviews, with an average rating of 7.10/10. The site's critical consensus reads, "Super brief but efficient, Following represents director Christopher Nolan's burgeoning talent in tight filmmaking and hard-edge noir." On Metacritic, the film has a weighted average score of 60 out of 100 based on 11 critics, indicating "mixed or average reviews".

Los Angeles Times reviewer Kevin Thomas was particularly impressed with the film, saying that it was a "taut and ingenious neo-noir" and that "as a psychological mystery it plays persuasively if not profoundly. Nolan relishes the sheer nastiness he keeps stirred up, unabated for 70 minutes." The New Yorker wrote that Following echoed Hitchcock classics, but was "leaner and meaner". TV Guide called it "short, sharp and tough as nails", praising its fast-paced storytelling and "tricky, triple-tiered flashback structure." David Thompson of Sight and Sound commented that "Nolan shows a natural talent for a fluent handheld aesthetic."

However, Tony Rayns felt that the film's climax was uninspired, saying that "the generic pay off is a little disappointing after the edgy, character based scenes of exposition". Empire's Trevor Lewis questioned the skill of the film's inexperienced cast, saying that they "lack the dramatic ballast to compensate for [Nolan's] erratic plot elisions." In contrast, David Thompson was of the opinion that the "unfamiliar cast acquit themselves well in a simple naturalistic style." Filmmaker Joel Schumacher thought Following was the work of a "brilliant" young director. "I always had him in the back of my mind, thinking, 'We're going to hear from this guy, big time.' Then I saw Memento and the promise was fulfilled very fast."

Following has since been recognized as one of the most notable no-budget films of its time.

Accolades
Following won several awards during its festival run, including the Tiger Award at the Rotterdam International Film Festival and the "Best First Feature" prize at the San Francisco International Film Festival, among others. Following also brought fame to Christopher Nolan who was just starting out in the form of the Black and White award as well as a Grand Jury Prize nomination at Slamdance Film Festival.

Release
A Blu-ray and DVD restoration of the film with a new 5.1 sound mix was released by The Criterion Collection for Region A on 11 December 2012. Both the Blu-ray and DVD include a commentary by and an interview with director Christopher Nolan, a chronological edit of the film (also 70 min.), a side-by-side comparison between three scenes of the film and the shooting script, Nolan's 1997 short film Doodlebug, and both the theatrical and re-release trailers. Each edition also has a leaflet which includes an essay by film critic Scott Foundas, titled "Nolan Begins". Exclusive to the Blu-ray is an uncompressed monaural soundtrack to the film.

References

External links

Following: Nolan Begins an essay by Scott Foundas at the Criterion Collection

1998 films
1998 crime thriller films
1998 independent films
1990s mystery films
British black-and-white films
British crime thriller films
British independent films
British mystery films
Films directed by Christopher Nolan
Films produced by Christopher Nolan
Films produced by Emma Thomas
Films set in London
Films shot in London
British neo-noir films
British nonlinear narrative films
Films with screenplays by Christopher Nolan
Films scored by David Julyan
1998 directorial debut films
Films shot in 16 mm film
1990s English-language films
1990s British films